The Arrondissement of Mouscron is a former arrondissement in the Walloon province of Hainaut, Belgium. It is not a judicial arrondissement. Its municipalities are a part of the Judicial Arrondissement of Tournai.

The arrondissement was created in 1963 after several municipalities were transferred from the Dutch-speaking province of West Flanders to French-speaking Hainaut following the language laws of 1962. In 2019 it was merged into the new Arrondissement of Tournai-Mouscron.

Municipalities
The Administrative Arrondissement of Mouscron consists of the following municipalities and former municipalities (with their Dutch name):
 Comines-Warneton (Komen-Waasten)
 Comines (Komen)
 Houthem
 Ploegsteert
 Bas-Warneton (Neerwaasten)
 Warneton (Waasten)
 Mouscron (Moeskroen)
 Mouscron (Moeskroen)
 Luingne
 Dottignies (Dottenijs)
 Herseaux (Herzeeuw)

References 

Mouscron